Asota caledonica is a moth of the family Erebidae first described by Jeremy Daniel Holloway in 1979. It is found in New Caledonia.

References

Asota (moth)
Moths of Oceania
Moths described in 1979